P. rosea may refer to:
 Palafoxia rosea, the rosy palafox
 Partula rosea, a gastropod species endemic to French Polynesia
 Petroica rosea, the rose robin, a small passerine bird species native to Australia
 Phenatoma rosea, the pink tower shell, a predatory sea snail species
 Primula rosea, the Himalayan meadow primrose, a flowering plant species

Synonyms 
 Paxtonia rosea, a synonym for Spathoglottis plicata
 Phalaenopsis rosea, a synonym for Phalaenopsis equestris
 Plumbago rosea, a synonym for Plumbago indica
 Potentilla rosea, a synonym for Fragaria × Comarum hybrids

See also 
 Rosea (disambiguation)